

This is a list of the National Register of Historic Places listings in Jo Daviess County, Illinois.

This is intended to be a complete list of the properties and districts on the National Register of Historic Places in Jo Daviess County, Illinois, United States. Latitude and longitude coordinates are provided for many National Register properties and districts; these locations may be seen together in a map.

There are 18 properties and districts listed on the National Register in the county.

Current listings

|}

See also

List of National Historic Landmarks in Illinois
National Register of Historic Places listings in Illinois

References

Jo Daviess County, Illinois
Jo Daviess County, Illinois